Abul-Abbas, Charlemagne's elephant
Arjuna, lead elephant of the Mysore Dasara procession and carries the idol of the deity Chamundeshwari on the Golden Howdah
Balarama, preceded Arjuna (see above); Golden Howdah-carrier between 1999 and 2011
Bamboo, lived at the Woodland Park Zoo for many years and was the center of a campaign to have her moved to a sanctuary
Batyr (1970–93), "talking elephant" of Karagandy Zoo in Kazakhstan
Black Diamond, Indian elephant with Al G. Barnes Circus; killed four people and was subsequently shot in 1929
Castor and Pollux, served as food to the wealthy citizens of Paris during the siege in 1870
Chengalloor Dakshayani, an Asian female elephant lived in Chengalloor Mahadeva Temple in Thiruvananthapuram, Kerala. At the time of her death on 5 February 2019, she was believed to be the oldest elephant in captivity in Asia, at approximately 88 years old.
Chirakkal Kalidasan, one of the tallest elephants in Kerala, also notable for acting in some films, including the 2017 epic film, Baahubali 2: The Conclusion
Chunee, elephant in the menagerie at Exeter Exchange; executed by soldiers from Somerset House in March 1826
The Cremona elephant, given to Holy Roman Emperor Frederick II by the Sultan of Egypt in 1229
Dhurbe, wild elephant responsible for the deaths of 15 people 
Drona, preceded Balarama (see above); died from accidentally electrocuting himself in 1998
The Dundee Elephant, exhibited in Europe in the 17th and 18th centuries
Dunk, the first elephant to reside at the National Zoo in the United States
Echo, "most studied elephant in the world, the subject of several books and documentaries, including two NATURE films" 
Elephant of Henry III (c1245-1257), given to Henry III of England by Louis IX of France  
Fanny the elephant, former circus elephant that resided in Slater Park Zoo in Pawtucket, Rhode Island, from 1958 to 1993. She was moved to the Cleveland Amory Black Beauty Ranch sanctuary in 1993 because the city closed the zoo exhibits due to financial crises. She lived the last ten years of her life at the sanctuary and died in 2003. A statue to her memory stands in Slater Park.
 Gabi, a male Asian elephant born in 2005 at the Jerusalem Biblical Zoo and the first elephant in Israel conceived via artificial insemination.
Gita, death at the Los Angeles Zoo in 2006 sparked public outcry
Gold Dust, one of the first elephants to reside at the National Zoo in the United States
Guruvayur Keshavan, an Indian elephant which was associated with the Guruvayur temple in Kerala, India. The elephant was known for its extremely devout behaviour.
Hanno the elephant, pet elephant of Pope Leo X
Hansken, toured many European countries from 1637 to 1655 demonstrating circus tricks
Hattie of New York City's Central Park Zoo, in 1903 was described as the "most intelligent of all elephants"
Heiyantuduwa Raja, carried the Relic of the tooth of the Buddha from 1989 to 2000
Isilo of Tembe Elephant Park was one of South Africa’s largest African elephants and the largest living tusker in the southern hemisphere before his death in 2014
John L. Sullivan (1860?–1932), boxing elephant in Adam Forepaugh's circus.  In 1922, he made a pilgrimage from Madison Square Garden to the Elephant Hotel in Somers, New York, to pay tribute to Old Bet the elephant.
Jumbo, P. T. Barnum's elephant whose name is the origin of the word jumbo (meaning "very large" or "oversized"). The African elephant was given the name Jumbo by zookeepers at the London Zoo. The name was most likely derived from the Swahili word jumbe meaning "chief". The Tufts University mascot is named after Jumbo. In Mysore, India Vijayadashami Elephant procession during Dasara is called as Jumbo Savari (referred to as Jumbo Savari by the British during their control of Mysore State). The original name to this procession is Jumbi Savari (going to the Banni(Shami)tree). Now Goddess Chamundeshwari is taken in procession on an Elephant. But the "Jumbo" name is still intact. Jumbo was the name of another elephant, used by John Hoyte et al. to cross the Alps in 1959 to retrace Hannibal's march across the Alps.
Kaavan, subject to a lengthy campaign to have him moved to a sanctuary after the death of his companion
Kandula, the royal war elephant of the Sri Lankan prince Dutugamunu in the 2nd century BC. The king and his elephant grew up together. A Sri Lankan elephant born 25 November 2001 at the National Zoo in Washington, D.C., is named after Kandula.
Kashin, Asian Elephant from New Zealand. She was famous for being sponsored by ASB Bank, and featured in the New Zealand-produced television programme The Zoo.
Kolakolli, Indian rogue elephant from Peppara sanctuary that died in captivity in 2006
Kongad Kuttisankaran, a famous native elephant lived in Kerala
Kosik, able to imitate a number of Korean words
Kottur Soman, the oldest living elephant in the world
Lallah Rookh, elephant with Dan Rice's circus. She died in 1860 soon after swimming across the Ohio River.
Lizzie, who in 1916–1918 worked hauling goods in Sheffield in England
Lin Wang, Burmese elephant that served with the Chinese Expeditionary Force during the Sino-Japanese War (1937–1945) and later moved to Taiwan with the Kuomintang army. Lin Wang became a fond childhood memory among many Taiwanese. When he died at 86 years old in 2003, he was (and still is) the longest-living captive elephant.
Mademoiselle D'Jeck, performed in plays in Europe and the United States in the 19th century
Maha Pambata, war elephant belonging to Tamil King Ellalan
Mali, major attraction at the Manila Zoo in the Philippines
Mangalamkunnu Karnan, a famous elephant in Kerala known for his ability to hold the heads-up for a long time
Mary a.k.a. "Mighty Mary" and "Murderous Mary", circus elephant executed on September 13, 1916, in Erwin, Tennessee. She was hanged by a railroad derrick car at the Clinchfield Railroad yard. This is the only known elephant hanging in history. Mary, who toured with the Sparks World Famous Shows circus, killed her inexperienced keeper, Walter "Red" Eldridge, on 12 September 1916 during a circus parade in Kingsport, Tennessee. Eldridge had supposedly hit Mary's tusk or ear when she wandered from the parade line to eat a piece of discarded watermelon.
Millangoda Raja, believed to be the longest-tusked Asian elephant during his lifetime
Miss Jim, "The First Lady of the St. Louis Zoo" was the zoo's first elephant, and a star attraction from 1916 to 1948.
Mona, euthanized June 21, 2007 at the Birmingham Zoo in Birmingham, Alabama. Thought, at 60, to have been the oldest Asian elephant in the United States. After the death of her companion, Susie, Mona's health and living conditions were the subject of a long campaign to have her transferred out of the zoo to a sanctuary.
Motola, an Asian elephant in Thailand who stepped on a landmine in 1999
Motty, only confirmed Asian/African hybrid elephant; survived for just 10 days 
Nadungamuwa Raja, current main casket bearer of the procession of Esala
Old Bet, early American circus elephant owned by Hachaliah Bailey.  On July 24, 1816, she was shot and killed while on tour near Alfred, Maine, by a farmer who thought it was sinful for poor people to waste money on a traveling circus. Old Bet's owner responded by building a three-story memorial called the Elephant Hotel, which now serves as a town hall.
Old Hannibal, part of Isaac A. Van Amburgh's menagerie
Osama bin Laden, rogue elephant which killed at least 27 people in India from 2004 to 2006, and another that was active until killed in 2008
Packy (1962–2017), resident of Oregon Zoo (formerly Washington Park Zoo, originally Portland Zoo) in Portland, Oregon. First Asian elephant born in the Western Hemisphere in 44 years. At his death, he was the patriarch of the zoo's herd and had sired seven offspring (although only one remains alive in 2021, and none have produced any offspring).
Padayappa a wild elephant in Munnar known for its frequent visits in residential areas
Pampadi Rajan, one of the tallest elephants in Kerala
Paramekkavu Rajendran, an elephant from Kerala with the record for participating in most number of Thrissur Poorams
Queenie (Melbourne elephant) (−1944), gave rides for children at Melbourne Zoo for 40 years
Queenie (waterskiing elephant) (1952–2011), noted in the late 1950s and early 1960s for waterskiing for entertainment
Raja, elephant who carried the holiest Buddhist shrine in Kandy, Sri Lanka
Raja Gaj, bull elephant that lived in the Bardiya National Park, Nepal who was considered to be the world's largest Asian Elephant of modern times
Rajje (1951?–1963), performing elephant that escaped into the streets of Lansing, Michigan, and was killed by gunfire.
Rogue elephant of Aberdare Forest, ferocious bull elephant killed by J. A. Hunter in the Aberdare Range, Kenya
Rosie the Elephant, famous for promoting Miami Beach, Florida
Ruby (1973–1998), elephant artist, resided at the Phoenix Zoo; at least one painting by her was sold for $100,000
Salt and Sauce, considered the most famous British elephants of their era and mentioned in several circus books
Satao, one of Kenya's largest African elephants, had unusually large tusks and was killed by poachers in 2014
Suleiman the elephant, presented in 1551 to Maximilian II, the Holy Roman Emperor, by John III, the King of Portugal, and named after the Ottoman Sultan, Suleiman the Magnificent
Surus ("the Syrian"), mentioned as the bravest of Hannibal's 37 war elephants which crossed the Alps in 218 BC during the Second Punic War, by Cato the Elder in his book Origines
Tai, known for featuring in the films Larger than Life and Water for Elephants
Thechikottukavu Ramachandran, an Indian elephant
Thiruvambadi Sivasundar, an Indian elephant who lived at the Thiruvambadi Sri Krishna Temple in Thrissur, Kerala
Thrikkadavoor Sivaraju, one of the tallest elephants from Kerala
Tikiri, participated in the Kandy Esala Perahera
Tillie, the mascot of the John Robinson Circus known for wintering and spending her retirement in Terrace Park, Ohio
Topsy, (c. 1875 – 4 January 1903). In 1902, while with the Forepaugh Circus, she killed a spectator who burned her trunk with a lit cigar. In 1903 the owners of a Coney Island park where she ended up claimed they could no longer keep her and killed her via poison, electrocution, and strangling. The Edison Manufacturing movie company shot a film of the execution called Electrocuting an Elephant.
Tricia, last elephant residing at the Perth Zoo and one of the world's oldest captive elephants
Tuffi, young female elephant who fell from Wuppertal's suspended monorail into the river Wupper on 21 July 1950 (and survived the fall)
Tusko, billed as the meanest elephant
Tyke, circus elephant who on 20 August 1994 in Honolulu, Hawaii, killed her trainer Allen Campbell and gored her groom Dallas Beckwith, causing severe injuries during a Circus International performance before hundreds of horrified spectators. Tyke then bolted from the arena and ran through downtown streets of Kakaako for more than 30 minutes. Police fired 86 shots at Tyke, who eventually collapsed from the wounds and died.
Ziggy, famously rebellious elephant at Brookfield Zoo

See also
List of fictional pachyderms
Elephant Encyclopedia

References

 
Elephants
Lists of elephants